Henry Ward Dawson, Sr. (November 6, 1890 – 1963) was an American doubles tennis champion with Maurice E. McLoughlin. In 1916 they were the number two [seeded American doubles team. That year, they won the Pacific coast double championship and the United States sectional double championship in Chicago, Illinois.

Biography
He was born in Iowa on November 6, 1890 to John Dawson and Mabel Walker. He was raised in Los Angeles, attended the public school system, and then attended Stanford University. After graduation, he went to work for the Mexican Petroleum Company in Tampico, Mexico. He died in 1963.

Grand Slam finals

Doubles (1 runner-ups)

References

External links

1890 births
1963 deaths
American male tennis players
Stanford University alumni
Tennis players from Los Angeles